Christian Bobin (24 April 1951 – 24 November 2022) was a French author and poet.

Bobin received the 1993 Prix des Deux Magots for the book Le Très-Bas (translated into English in 1997 by Michael Kohn and published under two titles: The Secret of Francis of Assisi: A Meditation and The Very Lowly).

Works
Letter Purple (Ed Brandes, 1977)
Fire Room (Ed Brandes, 1978)
The kiss of black marble (Ed Brandes, 1984)
Sovereignty Vacuum (Ed.Fata Morgana, 1985)
Man of the disaster (Ed Fata Morgana, 1986)
Lady, king, jack (Ed Brandes, 1987)
Golden letters (Ed Fata Morgana, 1987)
The eighth day of the week (Ed Letters Vives, 1988)
Preface Air loneliness of Gustave Roud Fata Morgana 1988
The simple magic (Ed Letters Vives, 1989)
The missing part (Ed. Gallimard, 1989)
Praise of nothing (Ed Fata Morgana, 1990)
The peddler (Ed Fata Morgana, 1990)
The busy life (Ed Fata Morgana, 1990)
The woman next (Ed. Gallimard, 1990)
The other face (Ed Letters Vives, 1991)
The wonder and the dark (Ed. Paroles d'Aube, 1991) - Interviews with Christian Bobin
A small party dress (Ed. Gallimard, 1991)
The Very Lowly (Ed. Gallimard, 1992) -- Prix des Deux Magots 1993 Grand Prix of Catholic Literature 1993
A useless book (Ed Fata Morgana, 1992)
Isabelle Bruges (Ed. Weather, 1992)
Heart of Snow (Ed. Theodore Balmoral, 1993)
The Expulsion of the world (Ed Letters Vives, 1993)
The Unexpected (Ed. Gallimard, 1994)
 The Exhaustion (Ed. Weather, 1994)
A few days with them (Ed. Weather, 1994)
The Walking Man (Ed. Weather, 1995)
La Folle Allure (Ed. Gallimard, 1995)
Good for nothing, as his mother (Ed Letters Vives, 1995)
The More than alive (Ed. Gallimard, 1996)
Clemence Frog (Ed. Weather, 1996)
A conference of Helen Cassicadou (Ed. Weather, 1996)
Gael First, King of the abyss and Mornelongue (Ed. Weather, 1996)
The day Franklin ate the sun (Ed. Weather, 1996)
Give me something that would not die (Ed. Gallimard, 1996) - Black and White's Edward Boubat accompanied by texts by Christian Bobin
Self-Portrait with radiator (Ed. Gallimard, 1997)
Jay (Ed. Gallimard, 1998)
The Equilibrist (Ed. Weather, 1998)
The mere presence (Ed. Weather, 1999)
Self-Portrait with radiator (Ed. Gallimard, 2000)
Everyone is busy (Ed. Mercure de France, 1999)
Resurrecting (Ed. Gallimard, 2001)
The Light of the World (Ed. Gallimard, 2001)
The Enchantment and other simple texts (Ed. Gallimard, 2001)
Words for a farewell (Ed. Albin Michel, 2001)
Christ the poppies (Ed Letters Vives, 2002)
Mozart and the rain monitoring A disorder of red petals (Ed Letters Vives, 2002)
Louise Love (Ed. Gallimard, 2004)
Prisoner in the cradle (Ed. Mercure de France, 2005)
A library of clouds (Ed Letters Vives, 2006)
The White Lady (Ed. Gallimard, 2007)
The ruins of the sky (Ed. Gallimard, 2009)

References

1951 births
2022 deaths
People from Le Creusot
20th-century French male writers
20th-century French poets
Prix des Deux Magots winners
21st-century French poets
21st-century French male writers
French male poets
French Roman Catholic writers